Brush Hill is an unincorporated community in the County of Minburn No. 27, Alberta, Canada. It is located northeast of Vegreville and has a legal description of NE-10-54-14-W4.

Brush Hill School District No. 1032 was established on May 10, 1904. The last Brush Hill school was closed in 1952, and in 1954, the Brush Hill Community Society purchased the school to be used as a community centre.

See also 
 List of communities in Alberta

References

External links 
 Hermis Provincial Archives of Alberta - Brush Hill Church

County of Minburn No. 27
Unincorporated communities in Alberta
Ghost towns in Alberta